San Cesareo ( or Statio ad Statuas) is a town and comune in the Metropolitan City of Rome.  In ancient times, it was on the Via Labicana or Via Latina,  from Rome.

Sports
 
A.S.D. San Cesareo Calcio is an Italian association football club, based in this city.

In the season 2011–12 the team was promoted for the first time, from Eccellenza Lazio/B to Serie D.

References

San Cesareo